"On the Cult of Personality and Its Consequences" («O kul'te lichnosti i yego posledstviyakh»),  popularly known as the "Secret Speech", was a report by Soviet leader Nikita Khrushchev, First Secretary of the Communist Party of the Soviet Union, made to the 20th Congress of the Communist Party of the Soviet Union on 25 February 1956. Khrushchev's speech was sharply critical of the rule of the deceased General Secretary and Premier Joseph Stalin, particularly with respect to the purges which had especially marked the last years of the 1930s. Khrushchev charged Stalin with having fostered a leadership cult of personality despite ostensibly maintaining support for the ideals of communism. The speech was leaked to the West by the Israeli intelligence agency Shin Bet, which received it from the Polish-Jewish journalist Wiktor Grajewski.

The speech was shocking in its day. There are reports that the audience reacted with applause and laughter at several points. There are also reports that some of those present suffered heart attacks and others later took their own lives due to shock at the revelations of Stalin's use of terror. The ensuing confusion among many Soviet citizens, raised on panegyrics and permanent praise of the "genius" of Stalin, was especially apparent in Georgia, Stalin's homeland, where the days of protests and rioting ended with the Soviet army crackdown on 9 March 1956. In the West, the speech politically devastated organised communists; the Communist Party USA alone lost more than 30,000 members within weeks of its publication.

The speech was cited as a major cause of the Sino-Soviet split by China (under Chairman Mao Zedong) and Albania (under First Secretary Enver Hoxha) who condemned Khrushchev as a revisionist. In response, they formed the anti-revisionist movement, criticizing the post-Stalin leadership of the Communist Party of the Soviet Union for allegedly deviating from the path of Lenin and Stalin. Mao strengthened his own cult of personality equivalent to Stalin. In North Korea, factions of the Workers' Party of Korea attempted to remove Chairman Kim Il-sung, criticizing him for not "correcting" his leadership methods, developing a personality cult, distorting the "Leninist principle of collective leadership" and "distortions of socialist legality" (i.e. using arbitrary arrest and executions) and using other Khrushchev-era criticisms of Stalinism against Kim Il-sung's leadership. The attempt to remove Kim failed and the participants were arrested and later executed, allowing Kim to further strengthen his own cult of personality as well.

The speech was a milestone in the Khrushchev Thaw. It possibly served Khrushchev's ulterior motives to legitimize and consolidate his control of the Soviet Union's party and government after political struggles with Georgy Malenkov and firm Stalin loyalists such as Vyacheslav Molotov, who were involved to varying degrees in the purges. The Khrushchev report's "Secret Speech" name came because it was delivered at an unpublicized closed session of party delegates, with guests and members of the press excluded. The text of the Khrushchev report was widely discussed in party cells in early March, often with the participation of non-party members. The official Russian text was not openly published until 1989, during the glasnost campaign of the Soviet leader Mikhail Gorbachev.

Background 

The issue of mass repressions was known to Soviet leaders well before the speech. The speech itself was prepared based on the results of a special party commission (chairman Pyotr Pospelov, P. T. Komarov, Averky Aristov and Nikolai Shvernik), known as the Pospelov Commission, arranged at the session of the Presidium of the Party Central Committee on 31 January 1955. The direct goal of the commission was to investigate the repressions of the delegates of the 17th Congress of the All-Union Communist Party (Bolsheviks) in 1934.

The 17th Congress was selected for investigations because it was known as "the Congress of Victors" in the country of "victorious socialism" and so the enormous number of "enemies" among the participants demanded explanation. The commission presented evidence that in 1937 and 1938 (the peak of the period known as the Great Purge), over one-and-a-half million individuals, the majority being long-time CPSU members, were arrested for "anti-Soviet activities", of whom over 680,500 were executed.

Speech 
The public session of the 20th Congress had come to a formal end on 24 February 1956, when word was spread to delegates to return to the Great Hall of the Kremlin for an additional "closed session" to which journalists, guests and delegates from "fraternal parties" from outside the Soviet Union were not invited. Special passes were issued to those eligible to participate, with an additional 100 former party members, who had been recently released from the Soviet prison camp network, added to the assembly to add moral effect.

Premier Nikolai Bulganin, chairman of the Council of Ministers of the Soviet Union and then an ally of Khrushchev, called the session to order and immediately yielded the floor to Khrushchev, who began his speech shortly after midnight on 25 February. For the next four hours, Khrushchev delivered "On the Cult of Personality and Its Consequences" before stunned delegates. Several people became ill during the tense report and had to be removed from the hall.

Khrushchev read from a prepared report, and no stenographic record of the closed session was kept. No questions or debate followed Khrushchev's presentation and delegates left the hall in a state of acute disorientation. The same evening, the delegates of foreign communist parties were called to the Kremlin and given the opportunity to read the prepared text of the Khrushchev speech, which was treated as a top secret state document.

On 1 March, the text of the Khrushchev speech was distributed in printed form to senior Central Committee functionaries. That was followed, on 5 March, by a reduction of the document's secrecy classification from "Top Secret" to "Not for Publication". The Party Central Committee ordered that Khrushchev's Report be read at all gatherings of Communist and Komsomol local units, with non-party activists invited to attend the proceedings. Therefore, the "Secret Speech" was read publicly at literally thousands of meetings, making the colloquial name of the document something of a misnomer. The full text was officially published in the Soviet press in 1989.

Reporting

Shortly after the conclusion of the speech, reports of its delivery, and its general content, were conveyed to the West by Reuters journalist John Rettie, after a Soviet acquaintance briefed him about the speech a few hours before Rettie left for Stockholm on holiday. It was therefore reported in the Western media in early March. Rettie came to believe the information came from Khrushchev himself, via the intermediary.

The text of the speech was only slowly disclosed in Eastern Europe. It was never disclosed to Western communist party members by the nomenklatura, and most Western communists only became aware of the details of the text after The New York Times (5 June 1956), Le Monde (6 June 1956), and The Observer (10 June 1956) published versions of the full text.

The content of the speech reached the West through a circuitous route. A few copies of the speech were sent by order of the Soviet Politburo to leaders of the Eastern Bloc countries. Shortly after the speech had been disseminated, a Polish-Jewish journalist Wiktor Grajewski, visited his girlfriend, Łucja Baranowska, who worked as a junior secretary in the office of the First Secretary of the Polish United Workers' Party, Edward Ochab. On her desk was a thick booklet with a red binding, with the words: "The 20th Party Congress, the speech of Comrade Khrushchev". Grajewski had heard rumours of the speech and, as a journalist, was interested in reading it. Baranowska allowed him to take the document home to read.

As it happened, Grajewski had made a recent trip to Israel to visit his sick father, and resolved to emigrate there. After he read the speech, he decided to take it to the Israeli embassy, and gave it to Yaakov Barmor, who had helped Grajewski undertake his trip. Barmor, a Shin Bet representative, took photographs of the document and sent them to Israel.

By the afternoon of 13 April 1956, the Shin Bet in Israel had received the photographs. Israeli intelligence and United States intelligence had secretly agreed previously to co-operate on security matters. The photographs were delivered to James Jesus Angleton, the Central Intelligence Agency (CIA) head of counterintelligence, and in charge of the clandestine liaison with Israeli intelligence. On 17 April 1956, they reached the CIA chief, Allen Dulles, who quickly informed US President Dwight D. Eisenhower. After determining that the speech was authentic, the CIA leaked the speech to The New York Times in early June.

Summary 
While Khrushchev was not hesitant to point out the flaws in Stalinist practice in regard to the purges of the army and party and the management of the Great Patriotic War, the Soviet Union's involvement in World War II, he was very careful to avoid any criticism of Stalin's industrialization policy or party ideology. Khrushchev was a staunch party man and lauded Leninism and communist ideology in his speech as often as he condemned Stalin's actions. Stalin, Khrushchev argued, was the primary victim of the deleterious effect of the cult of personality, which, through his existing flaws, had transformed him from a crucial part of the victories of Lenin into a paranoiac man who was easily influenced by the "rabid enemy of our party", Lavrentiy Beria.

The basic structure of the speech was as follows:
 Repudiation of Stalin's cult of personality.
 Quotations from the classics of Marxism–Leninism which denounced the "cult of an individual", especially the Karl Marx letter to a German worker that stated his antipathy toward it.
 Lenin's Testament and remarks by Nadezhda Krupskaya (former People's Commissar for Education and wife of Lenin), about Stalin's character.
 Before Stalin, the fight with Trotskyism was purely ideological; Stalin introduced the notion of the "enemy of the people" to be used as "heavy artillery" from the late 1920s.
 Stalin violated the party norms of collective leadership.
 Repression of the majority of Old Bolsheviks and delegates of the 17th Congress, most of whom were workers and had joined the party before 1920. Of the 1,966 delegates, 1,108 were declared "counter-revolutionaries"; 848 were executed, and 98 of 139 members and candidates to the Central Committee were declared "enemies of the people".
 After the repression, Stalin ceased even to consider the opinion of the collective of the party.
 Examples of repression of some notable Bolsheviks were presented in detail.
 Stalin's order for the persecution to be enhanced: the NKVD was "four years late" in crushing the opposition, according to his principle of "aggravation of class struggle".
 Practice of falsifications followed to cope with "plans" for numbers of enemies to be uncovered.
 Exaggerations of Stalin's role in the Great Patriotic War (World War II).
 Deportations of whole nationalities.
 Doctors' plot and Mingrelian affair.
 Manifestations of personality cult: songs, city names and so on.
 Lyrics of the State Anthem of the Soviet Union (first version, 1944–1953), which had references to Stalin.
 The non-awarding of the Lenin State Prize since 1935, which should be corrected at once by the Supreme Soviet and the Council of Ministers.
 Repudiating the socialist realist literary policy under Stalin, also known as Zhdanovism, which affected literary works.

Influence 
On 30 June 1956, the Central Committee of the party issued a resolution, "On Overcoming the Cult of the Individual and Its Consequences", which served as the party's official and public pronouncement on the Stalin era. Written under the guidance of Mikhail Suslov, it did not mention Khrushchev's specific allegations. "Complaining that Western political circles were exploiting the revelation of Stalin's crimes, the resolution paid tribute to [Stalin's] services" and was relatively guarded in its criticisms of him.

Khrushchev's speech was followed by a period of liberalization, known as the Khrushchev Thaw, into the early 1960s. In 1961, the body of Stalin was removed from public view in Lenin's mausoleum and buried in the Kremlin Wall Necropolis.

Criticism 
Polish philosopher Leszek Kołakowski criticized Khrushchev in 1978 for failing to make any analysis of the system Stalin presided over, stating:"Stalin had simply been a criminal and a maniac, personally to blame for all the nation's defeats and misfortunes. As to how, and in what social conditions, a bloodthirsty paranoiac could for twenty-five years exercise unlimited despotic power over a country of two hundred million inhabitants, which throughout that period had been blessed with the most progressive and democratic system of government in human history—to this enigma the speech offered no clue whatever. All that was certain was that the Soviet system and the party itself remained impeccably pure and bore no responsibility for the tyrant's atrocities".Western historians also tended to take a somewhat critical view of the speech. J. Arch Getty commented in 1985 that "Khrushchev's revelations [...] are almost entirely self-serving. It is hard to avoid the impression that the revelations had political purposes in Khrushchev's struggle with Molotov, Malenkov, and Kaganovich". The historian Geoffrey Roberts said Khrushchev's speech became "one of the key texts of western historiography of the Stalin era. But many western historians were sceptical about Khrushchev's efforts to lay all the blame for past communist crimes on Stalin".

Footnotes

External links 
 Complete text of the speech (in English) in a contemporary pamphlet, with the original commentary by Nicolaevsky.
  Complete text of the speech (in Russian) in a contemporary pamphlet.
 The Personality Cult and Its Consequences. Complete text of the speech (in English) (from The Wilson Center).
 The Anti-Stalin Campaign and International Communism: A Selection of Documents, containing the text of the speech as well as reactions to it from the communist parties of the United States, Great Britain, France, and Italy
 "Khrushchev's speech struck a blow at the totalitarian system" – Mikhail Gorbachev's commentary on the Secret Speech from The Guardian's supplement.
 A "Stalinist" rebuttal of Khrushchev's "Secret Speech", 1956.
 The day Khrushchev denounced Stalin: former Reuters correspondent John Rettie recounts how he reported Khrushchev's speech to the world.

1956 in international relations
1956 in the Soviet Union
1956 speeches
Cold War speeches
Cults of personality
De-Stalinization
Documents of the Communist Party of the Soviet Union
February 1956 events in Europe
Political repression in the Soviet Union
Shin Bet
Speeches by Nikita Khrushchev
Works about Joseph Stalin